David Albertovich Frank-Kamenetskii (August 3, 1910 – June 2, 1970) was a Soviet theoretical physicist and chemist, professor and doctor of physical, chemical and mathematical sciences. He developed the thermal explosion theory, worked on plasma physics problems and in astrophysics.

Life
David A. Frank-Kamenetskii was born on 1910, August 3 in Vilna (Russia; now Vilnius, Lithuania) in a Jewish family. His parents were Albert G. Frank-Kamenetskii (1873–1935) and Anna A. Frank-Kamenetskii (née Hannah A. Arons; 1883–1948). In 1917–1918, the family left Vilna, spent one year near Moscow and finally resided in Irkutsk (Eastern Siberia), where Albert G. Frank-Kamenetskii became the chair of the Chemistry Department in the newly organized Irkutsk State University. In 1931, Frank-Kamenetskii graduated from the Siberian Technological Institute (now Tomsk Polytechnic University, Tomsk, Russia) in Metallurgy Engineering.

In 1932, he married Klavdia A. Kopytova and in the same year their daughter Tema was born.
From 1931 to 1934, Frank-Kamenetskii worked as a mining engineer in the Chita gold mines in Eastern Siberia and he was also teaching in a Chita engineering college.

In 1934, Frank-Kamenetskii wrote a letter to Professor Nikolay Nikolaevich Semenov  in Leningrad (now Saint Petersburg, Russia) about chemical thermodynamics. Impressed by the letter, Professor Semenov invited Frank-Kamenetskii to join the Institute of Chemical Physics as a graduate student. The Institute of Chemical Physics of the USSR Academy of Sciences was organized by Professor Semenov in 1931, in Leningrad. From 1934 to 1941, Frank Kamenetskii lived in Leningrad and worked in the Institute of Chemical Physics. Here he met Yakov Borisovich Zel'dovich, who became a close friend, and a fruitful collaboration began. He published several chemical papers in the topics of chain reactions, combustion theory and periodic chemical reactions.

In 1935, Frank-Kamenetskii divorced his first wife Klavdia and married Elena E. Fridman (1910–1992). Their first son was born two years later (Albert D. Frank-Kamentskii, 1937–1979). In 1938, Frank-Kamenetskii received his Candidate of Sciences (CSc) degree (PhD equivalent) in chemistry from the Institute of Chemical Physics.

After the Nazi Germany invasion at the Soviet Union (Operation Barbarossa) in June, 1941, Frank-Kamenetskii and his family was evacuated to Kazan on the Volga River,  where the Institute of Chemical Physics was relocated. During the family relocation, the second son, Maxim (1941– ), was born in
Gorky. During years 1941 to 1944, he worked in Kazan on the problem of graphite conversion to diamond. In 1943, he received the Doktor Nauk degree (DSc equivalent) in physics and mathematics from the USSR Academy of Sciences.

In 1944–1946, Frank-Kamenetskii lived in Gorky (now Nizhny Novgorod, Russia) and headed the Department of Technical Chemistry of the Gorky State University (now Nizhny Novgorod State University).

In 1947–1948, Frank-Kamenetskii lived in Moscow and worked in the Institute of Chemical Physics. In 1947, he published his major work "Diffusion and Heat Transfer in Chemical Kinetics" in Russian. Between 1948 and 1956, Frank-Kamenetskii lived in Sarov and worked on the Soviet atomic bomb project
in the secret military research institute code-named "Arzamas-16" or the "Installation". (In 1993, the Sarov became a sister city to Los Alamos, New Mexico, USA).

In 1952, his second daughter, Maria was born and in the same year he suffered a major heart attack. In 1956, Frank-Kamenetskii left the "Installation" for Moscow. Between 1956 and 1970, Frank-Kamenetskii was the head of a laboratory in the I. V. Kurchatov Institute of Atomic Energy and organized and headed the Department of Plasma Physics at the Moscow Institute of Physics and Technology. He was teaching plasma physics and published several major works in plasma physics and biophysics. Between 1960 and 1970, he was the editor of the major Russian popular science magazine, Priroda (Природа, in English: Nature). Frank-Kamenetskii died in Moscow on 2 June 1970 due to a heart failure.

Significant works

References

External links
 The life and works of David A. Frank-Kamenetskii 

1910 births
1970 deaths
Tomsk Polytechnic University alumni
Theoretical physicists
Soviet physicists
Fluid dynamicists
Academic staff of the Moscow Institute of Physics and Technology
Soviet chemists